Robert Max Friedrich Sauer (16 September 1898 – 22 August 1970) was a German mathematician. He was rector of the Technical University of Munich from 1954 to 1956 and president of the Bavarian Academy of Sciences and Humanities from 1964 to 1970.

Early life 
After graduating from high school in Bamberg and completing his military service in World War I as a non-commissioned officer in the artillery, Sauer studied mathematics and physics at the Technical University of Munich from 1919. In 1925 he received his doctorate.

Career 
After his habilitation in 1926 he taught at the university as lecturer for descriptive geometry. In 1932 he became associate professor and in 1937 full professor of applied mathematics and descriptive geometry at the TH Aachen.

During this time, Sauer joined the Nazi Party and became involved in the National Socialist German Lecturers League. Sauer was appointed dean, in part because of his party affiliation.

During World War II he worked on ballistics and supersonic gas dynamics, constructing analog computers to solve the differential equations involved. He was intensively supported by his friend, the mathematician Franz Krauß, who also taught in Aachen. These calculations were related to the calculation of the trajectories of V-1 and V-2 rockets sent to London. In 1944, he became a professor at the TH Karlsruhe.

After the end of the war, he was removed from office by the US occupying forces. In return, the French  made him an offer to work for the French government in ballistic research. Sauer was soon also employed by the U.S. government in the field of ballistic research.

In 1948, he became a professor at the Technical University of Munich and director of the Mathematical Institute - especially at the instigation of his friend Josef Lense. From 1954 to 1956, he was rector of university.

In 1950, he became a member of the Bavarian Academy of Sciences and was its president from 1964 to 1970. It endowed the Robert Sauer Prize in his honor. In 1962, he was elected a member of the German National Academy of Sciences Leopoldina.

References 

1970 deaths
1898 births
Nazi Party members
Knights Commander of the Order of Merit of the Federal Republic of Germany
Members of the Bavarian Academy of Sciences
Academic staff of the Technical University of Munich
Presidents of the Technical University of Munich
Academic staff of the Karlsruhe Institute of Technology
Academic staff of RWTH Aachen University
Ballistics experts
20th-century German mathematicians